Alex Hosking (born 1995/96) is a singer-songwriter from Adelaide, Australia. She came to prominence following her feature on the PS1 single "Fake Friends", which peaked at number 19 on the Official Singles Chart.

Early life 
Hosking was raised in Adelaide, Australia. She began writing songs at the age of seven.

Career 
Hosking began her singing career via a YouTube channel. This led to her recording her first album, Wish, in Nashville in 2012; the album has since been removed from download and streaming services. In the same year, she auditioned for The X Factor, reaching the Top 25 in the 'Under-25 Girls' category, and wrote the debut single, "Bodies", for Vera Blue.

Hosking began writing music professionally in 2017, some of her early work including "Saying Something" alongside Lucas & Steve and "Skin Deep" alongside Tom Ferry. Her debut single, "Monsters", was released in 2019.

In 2020, "Fake Friends", a song Hosking had written in 2017 with producer Mark Alston, was released as a collaboration with PS1, a DJ from New York City, with a music video premiering in June 2020. The song entered the UK Official Singles Chart in the same month, eventually peaking at number 19 in September 2020. By September 2020, the song was certified Silver by the British Phonographic Industry, and was eventually certified Gold in June 2021.

In 2021, Hosking released a second song alongside PS1, entitled "Life Goes On". The song peaked at number 41 in the Official Singles Chart.

Personal life
Hosking is based in London. She is dyslexic.

Discography

Singles

As lead artist

As featured artist

References 

Musicians from Adelaide
21st-century Australian women singers
Musicians with dyslexia
Year of birth uncertain
1990s births
Living people
Australian women singer-songwriters
Australian expatriates in the United Kingdom